The 2018–19 season was the club's fifth season since its establishment in 2014 and their fourth season in the Indian Super League.

Season overview

June 
On 9 June 2018, midfielder Hugo Boumous extended his contract with the club. On 17 June, Goa announced the signing of Lenny Rodrigues from Bengaluru FC. On 29 June, Goa signed Jackichand Singh from Kerala Blasters FC.

July 
On 8 July, Goa signed Lalthuammawia Ralte from Bengaluru FC. On 12 July, Goa signed full back Nirmal Chettri. On 20 July, Goa signed defender Mourtada Fall. On 25 July, midfielder Ahmed Jahouh extended his contract with the club.

August 
On 5 August, Goa signed full back Carlos Peña. On 14 August, Goa signed winger Miguel Palanca from Anorthosis Famagusta FC. Goa traveled to Spain for their pre-season preparations. They played their first friendly match of the season in against Deportiva Minera.

September 
They played five friendly matches in Spain, winning all the matches. They returned to Goa and played two friendlies against I-League clubs East Bengal and Indian Arrows and ended their pre-season preparations, they finished their pre-season without losing a single match.

October 
On 1 October, Goa started their 2018–19 Indian Super League season with a 2–2 away draw against NorthEast United. On 6 October, Goa won 1–3 away against Chennaiyin.

Pre-season and friendlies 
  

On 22 August 2018, Goa began their pre-season tour in Spain. Goa played some friendly matches with their first match against Deportiva Minera, second match against Cartagena B, third match with Cartagena FC, fourth with Mar Menor FC and fifth with CD Algar. They returned to Goa and played their sixth friendly match against East Bengal and Indian Arrows.

Competitions

Indian Super League

Table

Results summary

Matches

Group stage

Goalscorers

Goalscorers (Against)

Squad information

 (captain)

Current technical staff
, FC Goa's head coach is Sergio Lobera. He has signed a two-year contract and begins with the club in July 2017.

Transfers and loans

Transfers in

Transfers out

References

External links

FC Goa seasons
Goa